is a city located in Ibaraki Prefecture, Japan. , the city had an estimated population of 95,384 in 40,759 households and a population density of 649 persons per km2. The percentage of the population aged over 65 was 23.6%.

Geography
Kamisu is located in the extreme southeastern portion of Ibaraki Prefecture. The city forms a rough triangle, with Chiba Prefecture on the western side and the Pacific Ocean on the east. The Tone River flows through the city.

Surrounding municipalities
Ibaraki Prefecture
 Kashima
 Itako
Chiba Prefecture
Katori
Chōshi
Tōnoshō

Climate
Kamisu has a Humid continental climate (Köppen Cfa) characterized by warm summers and cool winters with light snowfall.  The average annual temperature in Kamisu is 14.8 °C. The average annual rainfall is 1508 mm with September as the wettest month. The temperatures are highest on average in August, at around 25.7 °C, and lowest in January, at around 4.7 °C.

Demographics
Per Japanese census data, the population of Kamisu has recently plateaued after decades of strong growth.

History
The village of Kamisu was established within Kashima District by the merger of the villages of Ikisu and Karuno on March 1, 1955. It was elevated to town status on January 1, 1970.
The city of Kamisu was established on August 1, 2005, from the merger of the town of Kamisu and the town of Hasaki (also from Kashima District).

Government
Kamisu has a mayor-council form of government with a directly elected mayor and a unicameral city council of 23 members. Kamisu contributes two members to the Ibaraki Prefectural Assembly. In terms of national politics, the city is part of Ibaraki 2nd district of the lower house of the Diet of Japan.

Economy
Kamisu has a large industrial base, with many chemical, petrochemical, specialty chemical plants, and refineries. The city is part of the Kashima Rinkai Industrial Zone. The Kashima Power Station is also located in Kamisu.

Education
Kamisu has 14 public elementary schools and eight public middle schools operated by the city government, and three public high schools operated by the Ibaraki Prefectural Board of Education.

Transportation

Railway
Kamisu is served by the Kashima Rinkai Railway Kashima Rinkō Line, an all-freight railway line. The city does not have any passenger railway service.

Highway

Seaport
Port of Kashima

Sister city relations
 – Eureka, California, USA – sister city since 1991

Local attractions
Ikisu Jinja
Gonoike Ryokuchi Park

Notable people from Kamisu 
Mitsutoshi Furuya, manga artist
Tsukushi – female professional wrestler
Naoya Ishigami, professional soccer player
Keiji Suzuki, judoka and Olympic gold medalist
Takashi Ono, judoka
Kazuhiko Hosokawa, professional golfer
Tomi Okawa, table tennis player
Takashi Nagatsuka, writer, poet
Akira Kazami, politician
Atsushi Koyano, scholar of contemporary literature

References

External links

Official Website 

Cities in Ibaraki Prefecture
Port settlements in Japan
Populated coastal places in Japan
Populated places established in 1955
Kamisu